Barbara Burrage (1900 – 1989) was an American printmaker.

Her work is included in the collections of the Seattle Art Museum, the National Gallery of Art, the Smithsonian American Art Museum, the Crystal Bridges Museum of American Art and the Princeton University Art Museum.

References

1900 births
1989 deaths
20th-century American women artists